Grafrath is a municipality in the district of Fürstenfeldbruck in Bavaria in Germany.  It takes its name from Saint Rasso (Ratho), a count (Graf) who founded a Benedictine abbey in the 10th century, and which existed until 1803.

Points of interest 
 Forstlicher Versuchsgarten Grafrath, an arboretum

References

External links

 Warburg Institute Iconographic Database (Photos of the interior of the church of St Rasso).

Fürstenfeldbruck (district)